BalletMet is an American ballet company and training program based in Columbus, Ohio. Located in downtown Columbus, BalletMet facilities include a black box theatre performance space, seven dance studios, administrative offices, and costume and scene shops.

BalletMet's professional company stages 60 to 70 performances each year in Columbus and on tour. In the past, the company has toured 28 U.S. states and internationally to Russia, Poland, Egypt, Spain and Canada.  Edwaard Liang has led the Company as the Artistic Director for over 10 years.

BalletMet operates a dance academy that instructs about 1,500 students of all ages yearly. Classes offered include ballet, tap, modern, and Pilates. The current Academy Director is Maria Torija, a former professional dancer with Berlin State Ballet.

BalletMet developed DanceReach, a series of educational and outreach programs serving nearly 30,000 people annually. The DanceReach program offers up to 60 scholarships each year to talented youth, many from minority and under-served groups, who could not otherwise participate in dance training.

The current company came into existence in July 1978, with a $200,000 grant from the Battelle Memorial Institute Foundation. At that time it consisted of three staff and 12 dancers, and soon hired Wayne Soulant as its first artistic director. By 1997, the company had expanded to 25 dancers. The current company consists of 26 dancers and a second company of 6 dancers.

Professional Company 
BalletMet's main focus is an ensemble professional Company consisting of 25-26 dancers, depending on the season. BalletMet does not rank its dancers (ex. corps, demi-soloist, soloist, prima). The dancers are all members of AGMA. The repertoire is rooted in classical ballet techniques yet ranges greatly, often showcasing contemporary ballet work or postmodern influences in the same seasons as classics like The Nutcracker. This diversity of repertoire, unusual for American ballet companies, requires a strong ballet foundation and experience with other forms to perform successfully. Audience members thus enjoy a variety of artistic offerings each season.

BalletMet has an associated pre-professional company, BalletMet 2. BalletMet 2 performs with the Company in select shows throughout the season as well as in local schools as part of the Movement Makers initiative. BalletMet 2 dancers are selected during Company auditions.

Current Dancers 
BalletMet's current Company consists of the following dancers:

Erica Alvarado
Miguel Anaya
TyLeigh Baughman
Jessica Brown
Leiland Charles
Francesca Dugarte
Zachary Guthier
Johnathon Hart
Matoi Kawamoto
Miguel Wansing Lorrio
Rie Matsuura
Sophie Miklosovic
Beñat Andueza Molina
Rachael Parini
Austin Powers
Grace-Anne Powers
Sean Rollofson
Andrew Rossi
Alvin Tovstogray
Caitlin Valentine
Vincent Van Harris
Cooper Verona
David Ward
Victoria Watford
Karen Wing

BalletMet 2 

Jared Brouillette
Sarah-Ashley Chicola
Sumi Ichikawa
Xavier Pugliese-Ciulei
Tristan Toy
Annie Grace Wilson
Aleksandra Winkler

Artistic Directors 

 Wayne Soulant (1978–86)
 John McFall (1986–94)
 David Nixon (1995–2001)
 Gerard Charles (2001–12)
 Edwaard Liang  (2013–present)

References

External links 
 

Met, Ballet
1978 establishments in Ohio
Musical groups established in 1978
Musical groups from Columbus, Ohio
Dance in Ohio